Davey may refer to:

People
 Davey (given name)
 Davey (surname)
 Edward Davey Dunkle (1872–1941), American Major League Baseball pitcher
 Davey Havok (born 1975), stage name of David Marchand, lead vocalist of the rock band AFI

Places

Antarctica 
 Davey Nunataks, Princess Elizabeth Land
 Davey Peak, Marie Byrd Land
 Davey Point, King George Island, South Shetland Islands

Australia 
 Davey Street, Hobart, Tasmania
 Davey River, Tasmania

Other 
 Davey Lake (Alberta), Canada
 Davey Lake (Saskatchewan), Canada
 Davey, Nebraska, United States, a village

Entertainment
 The title character of the 1960s American stop-motion children's program Davey and Goliath
 "Davey", an episode in the fifth season of Adventure Time

Other uses
 Baron Davey, a life peerage bestowed on Horace Davey, Baron Davey (1833–1907), an English judge and politician
 , a harbor patrol entrance patrol and boarding vessel during World War I

See also
 Davey Boy Smith (1962–2002), British professional wrestler
 J*Davey, American music duo
 Davie (disambiguation)
 Davy (disambiguation)
 Daveys Bay, Victoria, Australia